In Greek mythology, Antigona or Antigone (Ancient Greek: Ἀντιγόνη meaning 'worthy of one's parents' or 'in place of one's parents') was the name of the following figures:

Antigone, daughter of Oedipus.
 Antigone, daughter of Eurytion and first wife of Peleus.
 Antigone, daughter of Laomedon.
Antigona, the Pheraean princess as the daughter of King Pheres and Clymene (or Periclymene) and thus, the sister of Admetus, Lycurgus, Eidomene and Periopis. Later on, she married Cometes of Peirasia and became the mother of Asterion, one of the Argonauts.

Notes

References 

 Apollodorus, The Library with an English Translation by Sir James George Frazer, F.B.A., F.R.S. in 2 Volumes, Cambridge, MA, Harvard University Press; London, William Heinemann Ltd. 1921. ISBN 0-674-99135-4. Online version at the Perseus Digital Library. Greek text available from the same website.
 Publius Ovidius Naso, Metamorphoses translated by Brookes More (1859-1942). Boston, Cornhill Publishing Co. 1922. Online version at the Perseus Digital Library.
 Publius Ovidius Naso, Metamorphoses. Hugo Magnus. Gotha (Germany). Friedr. Andr. Perthes. 1892. Latin text available at the Perseus Digital Library.

Women in Greek mythology
Thessalian characters in Greek mythology
Mythology of Achaea